Jahan Khanamlu (also Romanized as Jahān Khānamlū; also known as Jahān Khānlū and Jehān Khānlū) is a village in Anjirlu Rural District, in the Central District of Bileh Savar County, Ardabil Province, Iran. At the 2006 census, its population was 333, in 62 families.

References 

Towns and villages in Bileh Savar County